Wulfila is a genus of ghost spiders first described by O. Pickard-Cambridge in 1895. They are easily recognized by their pale white elongated legs.

Species
 it contains forty-three species:
Wulfila albens (Hentz, 1847) — USA
Wulfila albus (Mello-Leitão, 1945) — Brazil, Paraguay, Argentina
Wulfila arraijanicus Chickering, 1940 — Panama
Wulfila bryantae Platnick, 1974 — USA (Southern Florida), Mexico
Wulfila coamoanus Petrunkevitch, 1930 — Puerto Rico
Wulfila diversus O. Pickard-Cambridge, 1895 — Mexico
Wulfila fasciculus (Bryant, 1948) — Hispaniola
Wulfila fragilis Chickering, 1937 — Panama
Wulfila fragilis (Bryant, 1948) — Hispaniola
Wulfila gracilipes (Banks, 1903) — Hispaniola
Wulfila immaculatus Banks, 1914 — USA (Southern Arizona and New Mexico), Cuba, Puerto Rico
Wulfila immaculellus (Gertsch, 1933) — USA, Mexico
Wulfila inconspicuus Petrunkevitch, 1930 — Puerto Rico
Wulfila innoxius Chickering, 1940 — Panama
Wulfila inornatus (O. Pickard-Cambridge, 1898) — Mexico
Wulfila isolatus Bryant, 1942 — Puerto Rico
Wulfila longidens Mello-Leitão, 1948 — Guyana
Wulfila longipes (Bryant, 1940) — Cuba
Wulfila macer (Simon, 1898) — St. Vincent
Wulfila macropalpus Petrunkevitch, 1930 — Puerto Rico
Wulfila maculatus Chickering, 1937 — Panama
Wulfila mandibulatus (Petrunkevitch, 1925) — Panama
Wulfila modestus Chickering, 1937 — Panama
Wulfila pallidus O. Pickard-Cambridge, 1895 — Mexico
Wulfila parvulus (Banks, 1898) — Mexico
Wulfila pavidus (Bryant, 1948) — Mexico
Wulfila pellucidus Chickering, 1937 — Panama
Wulfila pretiosus Banks, 1914 — Cuba
Wulfila proximus O. Pickard-Cambridge, 1895 — Mexico
Wulfila pulverulentus Chickering, 1937 — Panama
Wulfila saltabundus (Hentz, 1847) — Eastern USA, southeastern Canada
Wulfila sanguineus Franganillo, 1931 — Cuba
Wulfila scopulatus Simon, 1897 — America
Wulfila spatulatus F. O. Pickard-Cambridge, 1900 — Guatemala
Wulfila spinosus Chickering, 1937 — Panama
Wulfila sublestus Chickering, 1940 — Panama
Wulfila tantillus Chickering, 1940 — Southern Texas to Panama
Wulfila tauricorneus Franganillo, 1935 — Cuba
Wulfila tenuissimus Simon, 1896 — Jamaica
Wulfila tinctus Franganillo, 1930 — Cuba
Wulfila tropicus Petrunkevitch, 1930 — Puerto Rico
Wulfila ventralis Banks, 1906 — Bahama Is.
Wulfila wunda Platnick, 1974 — USA (Southern Florida), Cuba, Puerto Rico (Mona Is.)

References

Further reading

 
 
 

Anyphaenidae
Araneomorphae genera